In taxonomy, Methanomethylovorans is a genus of microorganisms with the family Methanosarcinaceae. This genus was first described in 1999. The species within it generally live in freshwater environments, including rice paddies, freshwater sediments and contaminated soil. They produce methane from methanol, methylamines, dimethyl sulfide and methanethiol. With the exception of M. thermophila, which has an optimal growth temperature of 50 °C, these species are mesophiles and do not tend to grow at temperatures above 40 °C.

References

Further reading

Scientific journals

Scientific books

Scientific databases

External links

Archaea genera
Euryarchaeota